Portal 2 is a physics-based puzzle-platform game created by Valve and released on Microsoft Windows, Mac OS X, PlayStation 3, Xbox 360 and Linux in April 2011, followed by a Nintendo Switch version in June 2022. The game, set in the desolate, labyrinthine Aperture Science facility, challenges the player to navigate test chambers created by the artificial intelligence GLaDOS, using a portal gun, a device able to create portals that link two points in space like a wormhole. The game expands on the original Portal by adding new puzzle elements, such as paint that imparts properties to surfaces, plates that can launch the player and objects over distances, tractor beams and bridges made of light.

The game's music includes original scores composed by Valve's Mike Morasky, and two original songs provided by Jonathan Coulton and the band The National. The bulk of the music was released as a freely-available download across three volumes, entitled Songs to Test By, and later in a four-disc retail Collector's edition that included music from Portal.

"Want You Gone"

Jonathan Coulton's song "Still Alive", which is sung by GLaDOS (voiced by Ellen McLain) over Portals end credits, was considered a large part of Portal's success; in designing Portal 2, Valve desired to incorporate more music into the game, including further involvement from Coulton. Coulton wrote a new song for the game's ending credits, "Want You Gone", also written from GLaDOS's viewpoint. Coulton had discussed with Erik Wolpaw about whether an ending song would be necessary, and how they could create "an emotional moment" comparable to "Still Alive", back in 2009 when Portal 2s ending was not yet determined. Other options were considered, such as several "joke songs" and false endings for the game. Ultimately the game's finale, where GLaDOS effectively "breaks up" with Chell, was set by the last quarter of 2010, and Coulton played the game as it had been developed to that point to generate ideas. Elements of the ending, such as Chell being told to leave Aperture with the door slamming behind her, led to the development of main chorus line "I used to want you dead, but now I only want you gone." Coulton wrote the lyrics and composed the song over the course of several days, with John Flansburgh assisting on electronic drums, and traveled to Valve's headquarters in January 2011 to record it with McLain.

In addition to its inclusion in the Portal 2 soundtrack, a version of "Want You Gone" as sung by Coulton appears on his 2011 album Artificial Heart.

"Exile Vilify"

The indie rock band The National provided another original song, "Exile Vilify"; its lyrics were composed by the group and reviewed by Valve to ensure they fit with the tone of one of the Rattmann's dens, where it appears in-game. The National had expressed an interest in doing music for Valve to Bug Music, their publishing label, which the label forwarded on to Valve in discussing other music opportunities for the game. Valve and Bug Music identified that The National would fit well into Portal 2, as their "raw and emotive music evokes the same visceral reactions from its listeners that Portal does from its players" according to Bug Music's spokesperson Julia Betley. The song is considered by Paste to be a "haunted, piano-lead ballad" similar to the band's song "Think You Can Wait"  used in the film Win Win. "Exile Vilify" is not included in the freely downloadable Portal 2 soundtrack, but instead was released as a digital single by the band.

After the game's release, Valve and The National ran a contest encouraging users to create their own music video for "Exile Vilify", offering as prizes Valve merchandise and a guitar signed by members of the band. Of 320 videos submitted, Valve ultimately awarded two videos first prize. One video featured a sock puppet that "had nothing to do with Portal" but "managed to beautifully capture the spirit of the song", while the other provided an animated retelling of the Lab Rat comic.

Original music
Valve's Mike Morasky was the lead composer for the game's backing music. In keeping with the theme from Portal, Morasky wanted to create music that kept an "old future through a new lens" approach, such as by using minimalist electronic piano or mangled chiptunes. He also wanted to create music that would sound like it would have been composed by a computer, citing the use of "stiff arpeggios, math-like voice leading, odd rhythm patterns and whole tone scales" as a means to achieve this. Morasky also incorporated the briefly-seen singing turrets—all voiced by McLain— in the piece "Cara Mia Addio!" after recalling that she was a former opera singer, and used snippets of her singing to create something that still sounded synthetic. Except for McLain's vocals, all the music is based on synthesized or sampled sounds, and even with McLain, her voice was resampled to make it sound like a computer. McLain wrote "GLaDOS' Song" (possibly better known as "Don't Say Goodbye") from the character's point of view, showing GLaDOS' more sentimental connection to Chell. She intended it to be an Easter egg, though it was not used in the game. Jagger Gravning of Vice later had her record the song with her husband John Patrick Lowrie, and Lowrie uploaded it to YouTube in 2015.

Morasky created procedurally generated music, which is generated in real time based on the player's actions. This type of music system was based on the previous success of incidental music used in the Left 4 Dead series, and was developed to create a generalized platform for reuse in future Valve productions. Such music is generated by the player's interaction with various puzzle objects in the test chambers, such as launching from an Aerial Faith Plate. Morasky designed the procedure to build out the music more as the player completed more of each puzzle. Morasky also saw this as a means to provide experimentation to the player, exploring both space and timing of events to alter the composition of the music.  Morasky claims that one piece of music "only repeats itself every 76,911 years, 125 days, 7 hours, 56 minutes and 30.3 seconds". Morasky designed this dynamic music as a reward for successfully completing puzzles.

Songs to Test By

Songs to Test By is the three-volume soundtrack for Portal 2, containing nearly all of the music from the game.  The soundtrack was released freely to the Internet volume-by-volume between May and September 2011.  Along with the soundtrack, Valve included several Portal 2-themed ringtones.

Soundtrack listing
All tracks are written by Mike Morasky unless otherwise noted.

A retail four-disc collection, Portal 2: Songs to Test By (Collector's Edition), was released on October 30, 2012 through Ipecac Recordings. Three of the discs include the music already available (listed above), while the fourth disc includes songs from Portal. A mini-comic, "Turret Lullaby", is also included.

Reception
Kym Dillon of IGN used the soundtrack of Portal 2, amongst a few other soundtracks, as an example how a game can use both source music (music that is part of the game environment) and underscoring (music that is only for the player) to create atmosphere in games; Dillon also mentions that he "especially" liked the game's soundtrack. Alyssa Grimley of the Seattle Post-Intelligencer praised Morasky's composing of the soundtrack and called it an "understated genius". She also praised Jonathan Coulton's song "Want You Gone" for the way in which it reflects the changed spirit of GLaDOS when compared to "Still Alive" from the first game. Kirk Hamilton of Kotaku listed Portal 2 as possessing one of the best musical scores in video games for 2011, praising both the composed songs and the dynamically-generated elements.

For the 2011 Spike Video Game Awards, both "Want You Gone" and "Exile Vilify" were nominated for "Best Song in a Game", while the soundtrack was nominated for "Best Original Score". Portal 2s soundtrack was awarded for "Outstanding Achievement in Original Music Composition" at the 15th Annual Interactive Achievement Awards. The game was awarded the "Best Audio" 2012 Game Developers Choice Awards. The Game Audio Network Guild awarded Portal 2 with the "Best Interactive Score" (along with Kinect Disneyland Adventures), and "Best Original Vocal - Pop" for "Want You Gone".

References

External links

Portal 2
Portal (series)
Portal 2
Portal 2